Hrkovce is a village and municipality in the Levice District in the Nitra Region of Slovakia. Following the 2022 elections, the mayor is Róbert Magyar, an independent candidate.

History
The village was first mentioned in historical records in 1156.

Geography
The village lies at an altitude of 205 metres and covers an[area of 8.197 km². It has a population of about 320.

Ethnicity
The village is approximately 58% Magyar and 42% Slovak.

Facilities
The village has a public library.

See also
 List of municipalities and towns in Slovakia

References

External links
https://web.archive.org/web/20070513023228/http://www.statistics.sk/mosmis/eng/run.html
Surnames of living people in Hrkovce

Villages and municipalities in Levice District